Ho Man Tin is an underground MTR rapid transit station on the  and the , located beneath Valley Road in Lo Lung Hang, as part of the Sha Tin to Central Link project. The station's lower platforms (serving Kwun Tong line trains) opened on 23 October 2016 along with Whampoa station as part of the Kwun Tong line extension, while the upper platforms of the  opened on 27 June 2021.

History
Ho Man Tin station was constructed under the HK$2.97 billion Kwun Tong Line Extension Contract 1001, which was awarded in 2011 to Nishimatsu Construction. This contract covered not only the station, but also the railway tunnels between Yau Ma Tei and Whampoa Station, including a ventilation building halfway between Yau Ma Tei and Ho Man Tin.

The new , eight-level railway station, cruciform in plan, was built on the site of the Valley Road Estate, which had been demolished a decade earlier. Built into a hillside, the station is partly underground and partly above-ground. The underground levels were excavated through the drill-and-blast method.

The Kwun Tong line platforms of Ho Man Tin station opened on 23 October 2016. The Tuen Ma line platforms opened on 27 June 2021.

Station layout

The station is located between Chung Hau Street and Chatham Road North. While the Tuen Ma line platforms were boarded up, they were used as a passageway between the concourse and the Kwun Tong line platforms.

During the peak period, some westbound Kwun Tong line trains terminate at platform 2 and proceed eastbound past the scissors crossover to a reversing siding. This arrangement exists due to the limited capacity of the single terminating track at Whampoa, which cannot turnaround all Kwun Tong line trains during the peak period.

Exits 
 A1: Yan Fung Street
 A2: Fat Kwong Street
 A3: Ho Man Tin Estate, Oi Man Estate, Hong Kong Metropolitan University
 B1: Chatham Road North (Hung Hom)
 B2: Transport Interchange, Oi Man Estate

Gallery

Station art
Multiple artwork is installed in this station. One of the artworks "Between Nature and the City" has a cat on bottom right corner. According to its creator Alex Heung, the cat is called "Ai Cow", and was owned by a Chinese medicine store in Ho Man Tin. The cat went missing in 2014 and netizens have launched a search campaign on Facebook. Through this cat, Alex highlights the connection and emotion of people, community and environment in his artwork.

References 

MTR stations in Kowloon
Kwun Tong line
Sha Tin to Central Link
Tuen Ma line
Lo Lung Hang
Railway stations in Hong Kong opened in 2016